"Love Is All That Matters" is a song by British synthpop group the Human League. It was the third single to be taken from their fifth studio album, Crash (1986). It was released in 1986 in the US, where it did not chart, but not until two full years after the album on 3 October 1988 in other territories, to promote the band's Greatest Hits album.

Background
It was recorded in early 1986 at the Flyte Time studios in Minneapolis while the Human League were in residence recording Crash with producers Jimmy Jam and Terry Lewis. This song, like many other from the album, was a love song aimed towards the United States market, where the first single from Crash, "Human", had reached number one. However, this single failed and only charted in the UK where it reached number 41. As a result of the disappointing sales there would be no further releases from Crash. "Love Is All That Matters" was released principally to promote the imminent release of the first Greatest Hits album in 1988.

Cover artwork

The cover artwork (expanded) designed by Ken Ansell, is actually a gatefold of a single photograph of Susan Ann Sulley, Philip Oakey and Joanne Catherall. On the front of the vinyl versions and the CD, only Oakey is visible.

Critical reception
Graeme Kay from Smash Hits declared the song as "a flippin' corker", explaining, "It starts off with a mega-heavy disco beat, then in come the group's resident foxtresses Sue and Joanne who trill away over layer upon layer of tringly oriental type bells and after a while Philip Oakey starts to holler away frenziedly about "being faithful" 'cos "love is all that matters". Jolly good show."

Music video
The accompanying music video for "Love Is All That Matters" was a result of Virgin Records beginning to lose faith in the Human League and being reluctant to invest in any further elaborate music videos; so the video was kept deliberately low budget. The video is basically edited clips of all the band’s previous music videos to that point, spliced together with animated stills from the key points from those videos. This was also designed to provide a storyboard which promoted the band’s back catalogue to generate interest in the Greatest Hits compilation, the principal reason "Love Is All That Matters" was released in the first place.

Track listing

1986 US release
 12" vinyl (A&M Records SP-12227)
 "Love Is All That Matters (Extended Version)" – 7:45
 "Love Is All That Matters (7" Edit)" – 4:06
 "Love Is All That Matters (A Cappella)" – 2:45
 "Love Is All That Matters (Instrumental)" – 4:09

1988 international release
 7" vinyl (Virgin VS1025)
 "Love Is All That Matters (Edit)" – 4:06
 "I Love You Too Much" – 3:22

 12" vinyl (Virgin VST1025)
 "Love Is All That Matters (Extended Version)" – 7:45
 "I Love You Too Much (Dub)" – 5:54
 "Love Is All That Matters (Edit)" – 4:06

 CD (Virgin VSCD1025)
 "Love Is All That Matters (Edit)" – 4:06
 "I Love You Too Much (Dub Version)" – 5:54
 "Love Is All That Matters (Extended Version)" – 7:45

References

External links
 Record Data
 Review

The Human League songs
1988 singles
Songs written by Jimmy Jam and Terry Lewis
Song recordings produced by Jimmy Jam and Terry Lewis
1986 songs
Virgin Records singles